The men's slalom competition of the 2014 Winter Olympics at Sochi was held at Rosa Khutor Alpine Resort near Krasnaya Polyana, Russia, on Saturday, 22 February.

Summary
The tenth and final alpine event of the Olympics, the two runs were held in spring-like conditions. Of the top eight times after the first run, five did not finish the second run (André Myhrer, Jean-Baptiste Grange, Ted Ligety, Felix Neureuther, and Alexis Pinturault), which spawned criticism of the course. The second run was set by Ante Kostelić, known for idiosyncratic gate settings. He is the father of competitor Ivica Kostelić of Croatia, who finished ninth.

Less than seven weeks shy of his 35th birthday, Mario Matt of Austria became the oldest gold medalist in Olympic alpine skiing history. The silver went to defending World Cup champion Marcel Hirscher, and Henrik Kristoffersen became the youngest male to medal in an Olympic alpine event at age 19.

Results
The first run was held at 16:45 and the second run at 20:15.

References

External links
FIS-Ski.com – 2014 Winter Olympics – Men's slalom

Slalom